NSSF may refer to:
 National Shooting Sports Foundation
 National Social Security Fund (disambiguation)